The 2007 WNBL Finals was the postseason tournament of the WNBL's 2006–07 season. The Canberra Capitals were the defending champions and they successfully defended their title, defeating the Sydney Uni Flames 73–59. The 2007 Championship would be Canberra's fifth overall title.

Standings

Bracket

Semi-finals

(1) Sydney Uni Flames  vs. (2) Canberra Capitals

(3) Adelaide Lightning vs. (4) Dandenong Rangers

Preliminary final

(2) Canberra Capitals vs. (3) Adelaide Lightning

Grand Final

(1) Sydney Uni Flames vs. (2) Canberra Capitals

Rosters

References 

2007 Finals
2006-07
Women's National Basketball League Finals
2006–07 in Australian basketball
Aus
basketball
basketball